Williamsport is an unincorporated community and coal town in Johnson County, Kentucky, United States. Its ZIP code is 41271.

References

Unincorporated communities in Johnson County, Kentucky
Unincorporated communities in Kentucky
Coal towns in Kentucky